Roussel-Fidele Ngankam-Hontcheu (born 15 September 1993) is a footballer who plays as a forward. Born in Cameroon, Ngankam represented Germany internationally at youth levels.

Personal life
Ngankam's brother Jessic is also a footballer, and appeared for the Germany youth national teams.

References

External links
 
 
 

1993 births
Living people
People from West Region (Cameroon)
German footballers
Germany youth international footballers
Cameroonian footballers
German people of Cameroonian descent
Cameroonian emigrants to Germany
Naturalized citizens of Germany
Association football forwards
3. Liga players
Regionalliga players
Liga I players
Hertha BSC II players
1. FC Nürnberg II players
FC Botoșani players
SG Sonnenhof Großaspach players
Rot-Weiss Essen players
VfB Eichstätt players
SG Wattenscheid 09 players